Harpic is the brand name of a toilet cleaner launched in the United Kingdom in 1932 by Reckitt and Sons (now Reckitt). It is currently available in Africa, the Middle East, South Asia, the Asia-Pacific, Europe, and the Americas. The toilet cleaning products marketed under the brand name include liquids, tablets, wipes, brush systems, and toilet bowl and cistern blocks.

It contains hydrochloric acid (10%) as the active ingredient, along with butyl oleylamine and other ingredients, in an aqueous solution.

History
The original toilet cleaner was invented by Harry Pickup (hence the origin of the name Harpic), who was based in Roscoe Street, Scarborough, in North Yorkshire. He also invented Oxypic, which was a sealant used in cast iron heating systems, and patented the Lock & Lift circular manhole covers, which were used initially by the British Military. The company also produced the steel components used on the Mulberry harbours during the D-day landings.

Advertising
UK advertisements from the 1930s onwards used the slogan Cleans Round The Bend (for that reason, the name is occasionally used as slang for crazy – George Macdonald Fraser uses that sense in his autobiographical "Quartered Safe Out Here" when talking about an idiosyncratic British officer commanding an irregular unit. The 2008 Harpic advertisement, Send for the Experts, featured Tom Reynolds.

Products
, the Harpic product range was:
 Harpic Bathroom Cleaner 
 Harpic Power Plus
 Harpic Max Rim Block
 Harpic Hygienic
 Harpic All in 1
 Harpic Active Fresh Toilet Cleaner
 Harpic 100% Limescale Remover Toilet Cleaner
 Harpic Flushmatic
 Harpic 10X Max Clean (in Malaysia and other regions)

References

External links
 Reckitt Benckiser Product Information Website
 

Ingredients: Hydrochloric acid, Hydroxyethyl oleylamine, Cetyltrimethylammonium bromide, Ammonium chloride, Methyl salicylate, Butylated hydroxytoluene, Acid Blue 25, Acid red 88, Deionized Water

Cleaning product brands
Cleaning product components
Cleaning products
Reckitt brands
British inventions
Companies based in Scarborough, North Yorkshire